The Order of Jehova was a Swedish dynastic order of knighthood instituted in 1606 by King Charles IX of Sweden. The collar of the order was worn by the king alone, as head, although a report indicates that three Swedish princes wore a collar at the coronation of King Charles IX on 15 March 1606.

The kings motto was Jehovah "Iehovah solatium meum".

References

Literature
 Karl Löfström: Sverges riddarordnar (Stockholm 1948)
 Arvid Berghman: Nordiska riddareordnar och dekorationer (Malmö 1949)
 Rudolf Cederström: Katalog (Stockholm 1948)
 Rudolf Cederström: Svenskt Silversmide 1520 - 1850 (Stockholm 1941)
 Michael Conforti en Guy Walton: Royal treasures of Sweden 1500 - 1700 (Washington 1988)

External links

The Swedish Royal armoury

Orders of chivalry of Sweden
1606 establishments in Sweden